Sognesjøen is a strait in Vestland county, Norway. The strait is the outermost part of the large Sognefjorden. It runs along the border between Solund and Gulen municipalities. The strait then flows in a southwesterly direction into the North Sea, just north of the island municipality of Fedje (in Hordaland county). The Sognesjøen is surrounded by many large and small islands. The islands of Sula, Steinsundøyna, Ytre Sula lie along the northern side of the strait. The mainland and the islands of Hiserøyna, Hille, Kversøyna, and Byrknesøyna lie along the southern side of the strait.

References

Fjords of Vestland
Gulen
Solund
Sognefjord